The event was being held for the first time since 1974.

Cliff Letcher and Dick Stockton won the title, defeating Syd Ball and Kim Warwick 6–3, 4–6, 6–4 in the final.

Seeds

Draw

Finals

Top half

Bottom half

References
Draw
Draw

Next Generation Adelaide International
Doubles
Marlboro South Australian Men's Tennis Classic - Doubles
Marlboro South Australian Men's Tennis Classic - Doubles